Suchodus is an extinct genus of marine crocodyliform from the Middle to Late Jurassic period of England and France.

Taxonomy and phylogeny
 
In the 2000s, phylogenetic analysis has shown that Suchodus is a distinct metriorhynchid genus.

Valid species are:
S. brachyrhynchus: Western Europe (England and France) of the Middle-Late  Jurassic (Callovian and Oxfordian); Metriorhynchus cultridens is a junior synonym.
S. durobrivensis: Western Europe (England and France) of the Middle Jurassic (Callovian). Was originally the type species of the genus Suchodus, but it was regarded as a junior synonym of Metriorhynchus by Andrews, 1913.

References

Prehistoric animals of Europe
Jurassic crocodylomorphs
Fossil taxa described in 1890
Prehistoric pseudosuchian genera
Prehistoric marine crocodylomorphs
Oxford Clay